CCCA be an abbreviation for:

Central centrifugal cicatricial alopecia
Classic Car Club of America
correlation consistent Composite Approach
Canyon Creek Christian Academy
Comprehensive Crime Control Act of 1984